George Breed (July 14, 1876 – June 24, 1956) was an American fencer. He competed at the 1912 and 1924 Summer Olympics. Breed won multiple national titles in the 1910s and 1920s, and was inducted into the USA Fencing Hall of Fame in 2018.

References

External links
 

1876 births
1956 deaths
Olympic fencers of the United States
Fencers at the 1912 Summer Olympics
Fencers at the 1924 Summer Olympics
Sportspeople from Louisville, Kentucky
American male épée fencers
Harvard Crimson fencers
American male foil fencers